The 2014–15 FA Trophy was the 45th season of the FA Trophy, the Football Association's cup competition for teams at levels 5–8 of the English football league system.  A total of 275 clubs entered the competition, which was won by Conference North club North Ferriby United after beating Conference team Wrexham in the final on 29 March 2015. Competition ran one club shorter than usual after Conference South club Salisbury City was disbanded before the season started, thus one club were to get a bye in the third round qualifying.

Calendar

Preliminary round
A total of 128 clubs, from Level 8 of English football, entered preliminary round of the competition. Eight clubs from level 8 get a bye to the first round qualifying - Barkingside, Bishop's Cleeve, Carlton Town, Evesham United, Farsley, Merstham, Scarborough Athletic and Worthing. The matches were played on 18 October 2014.

|}

First round qualifying
A total of 144 teams took part in this stage of the competition including 64 winners from the preliminary round, 72 teams from Level 7 of English football and eight teams from level 8, who get a bye in the previous round. The matches were played on 1 November 2014.

|}

Second round qualifying
A total of 72 clubs took part in this stage of the competition, all winners from the first round qualifying. The matches were played on 15 November 2014.

|}

Third round qualifying
A total of 80 clubs took part in this stage of the competition, all winners from the second round qualifying and 43 clubs from Level 6 of English football. As Conference South club Salisbury City was disbanded before the season started, this stage was one team short. Leiston received a bye to the first round proper. The matches were played on 29 November 2014.

|}

First round proper
A total of 64 clubs took part in this stage of the competition, all winners from the third round qualifying, one club that received a bye in the previous round and 24 teams from Level 5 of English football. The matches were played on 13 December 2014.

|}

Second round proper
A total of 32 clubs took part in this stage of the competition, all winners from the first round. The matches were played on 10 January 2015.

Third round proper
A total of 16 clubs took part in this stage of the competition, all winners from the second round. The matches were played on 24 January 2015.

Fourth round proper
A total of eight clubs took part in this stage of the competition, all winners from the third round. The matches were played on 7 February 2015.

|}

Semi-finals

First leg

Second leg

Final

References

2014–15
Fa Trophy
2014–15 in English football